Wladimir Tchertkoff is an Italian journalist.

He released with Emanuela Andreoli in 2003 the film The Sacrifice, a documentary on the liquidators of the Chernobyl nuclear power plant. This film received an award from the Île-de-France council for the best scientific and environment documentary in November 2004.

He has also received the award of the best documentary of the Festival of Scientific Movies of Oullins, France.

Tchertkoff is the author of Le Crime de Tchernobyl, le Goulag nucléaire (The Crime of Chernobyl, the Nuclear Goulag) published by Actes Sud, Paris.

He is also one of the founders of the organisation Children of Chernobyl Belarus.

Filmography
  The Atomic Trap (Le Piège atomique) (see online). 47 mn Documentary (1998).

Bibliography
  Wladimir Tchertkoff, Le Crime de Tchernobyl, le Goulag nucléaire, Actes Sud, April 2006

External links
  The Sacrifice
  Children of Chernobyl Belarus 
 Tchertkoff, Wladimir: The Crime of Chernobyl: The Nuclear Goulag Glagoslav Publications, London 2016, .

Swiss journalists
People associated with the Chernobyl disaster
Year of birth missing (living people)
Living people